Nanhu District is a district in Jiaxing, Zhejiang Province of China. Its former name was Xiucheng District, and it changed to current name on 17 May 2005.
At the end of 2013, the number of households registered in Nanhu District

Population
According to administrative divisions was 168,982, with a population of 48,905, an increase of 1.2% over the previous year. Among them, the non-agricultural population was 340,708, an increase of 1.7% over the previous year. The annual birth rate is 8.64%, the mortality rate is 6.45%, the natural population growth rate is 2.19%, and the family planning rate is 98.81%.

Transportation
Nanhu District is surrounded by Shanghai Hongqiao International Airport, Shanghai Pudong International Airport, Hangzhou Xiaoshan International Airport and Ningbo Lishe International Airport. It is also close to the Port of Shanghai, Beilun Port and Zhangpu Port, as well as Shanghai–Changzhou Expressway and Ningbo. (Pu) Jia (Xing) Su (State) Expressway and three expressways connecting Shanghai to Ningbo's Hangzhou Bay Bridge.

The Shanghai-Hangzhou Railway Double Line, China National Highway 320 and Beijing-Hangzhou Grand Canal run through the whole area of Nanhu District. Among them, there are more than 80 pairs of passenger and freight trains on the Shanghai-Hangzhou Railway, and more than 100,000 passengers are transported daily, and more than 50,000 tons of goods are sent. The Beijing-Hangzhou Grand Canal is perennial. It is a 500-ton ship and is connected to the Zhapu Port and the railway transit port by a river network.

Administration
Nanhu District is divided into 13 township-level towns or subdistricts (街道), including five inner subdistricts, four outer subdistricts and four towns.

Inner subdistricts: 
Jianshe (建设)
Jiefang (解放)
Xinjia (新嘉)
Xinxing (新兴)
Nanhu

Outer subdistricts: 
Chengnan (城南)
Changshui (长水) 
Dongzha (东栅) 
Qixin (七星)

Towns: 
Yuxin 
Fengqiao
Xinfeng
Daqiao

External links
Official website of Nanhu District Government

Districts of Zhejiang
Jiaxing